Paul Fischer may refer to:

Paul Fischer (footballer) (1882–1942), German footballer
Paul Fischer (luthier) (born 1941), British maker of musical instruments
Paul Fischer (painter) (1786–1875), German painter
Paul Fischer (sailor) (born 1922), German Olympic sailor
Paul Fischer (sportsman) (1881–?), German athlete and gymnast
Paul Gustav Fischer, Danish artist
Paul Henri Fischer (1835–1893), French physician, zoologist and paleontologist

See also
Paul Fisher (disambiguation)